Emile Mehdi Dorval (born 9 February 2001) is a Algerian professional footballer who plays as a right-back for Italian  club Bari.

Club career
Dorval began his senior career at Aubervilliers before moving to Italy in early 2021 and playing in the fourth-tier Serie D clubs Fasano and Audace Cerignola.

On 2 July 2022, Dorval signed a three-year contract with Serie B club Bari. He made his Serie B debut for Bari on 28 August 2022 in a game against Perugia.

Personal life
Dorval was born in France to a Réunionnais father and Algerian mother.

References

External links
 

2001 births
Living people
French footballers
Association football defenders
FCM Aubervilliers players
U.S.D. Città di Fasano players
S.S.D. Audace Cerignola players
S.S.C. Bari players
Championnat National 3 players
Serie D players
Serie B players
French expatriate footballers
Expatriate footballers in Italy
French expatriate sportspeople in Italy
French people of Réunionnais descent
French sportspeople of Algerian descent